Adam Michael Neely (born 1988) is an American YouTuber, bassist, and composer. His YouTube channel is described as containing "music theory, music cognition, jazz improvisation, musical performance technique, musicology and memes". He also creates "Gig Vlogs", which give insight into his life as a professional musician in New York City.  As a musician, he performs as a solo artist, as a session musician, and as a member of a number of New York City-based ensembles, including the electro-jazz duo Sungazer (along with drummer Shawn Crowder), and the jazz bands Adam Neely's Jazz School and Aberdeen.

Education 
Adam Neely graduated from Berklee College of Music with a B.A in Jazz Composition in 2009 and in 2012, received a Masters of Music in Jazz Composition from The Manhattan School of Music as directed under Jim McNeely. He was awarded the Herb Alpert ASCAP Young Jazz Composer award in 2012 and 2015 as well as the Jerome Fund commission prize in 2014, for his work "Exigence".

Career 
Neely appeared on the BIMM podcast EP.8 to discuss his beginnings in music and approach to creating content. He discussed bass and the role of social media with YouTube bass educator Scott Devine in this podcast. He has also been interviewed by Music U.

Neely is a founding member of the electro-jazz and EDM band Sungazer. He regularly performs with rock band Bright and Loud, indie-soul group Jae Soto, his large ensemble Mass Extinction Event, and a number of singer-songwriters based in New York.

On May 18–20, 2019, Adam Neely, as a member of the band Aberdeen, was hired by the United States Department of State to go to Kyrgyzstan on a three-day tour that included two concerts and a workshop. The first concert was held at the music venue Ololohaus Erkindik in Bishkek. The band was joined by the Kyrgyzstani band Choro in a collaborative concert of American rock music. They then held a workshop and masterclass for underprivileged and young students at first the A. Novoi School, located in the Osh region in southwest Kyrgyzstan, and then a select group of students within the Access Microscholarship program at the Osh Regional Library. They completed their ambassadorship with a concert at School #29 in the capital of Bishkek.

In August 2019, Neely defended Katy Perry's use of an ostinato in the song "Dark Horse" after she was sued by the rapper Flame.

In December 2019, Neely earned a spot in the New Yorker's annual Christmas Poem.

Awards 

 Collaborative Emmy in "Outstanding New Approaches: Arts, Lifestyle, and Culture" (2020)
 ASCAP Young Jazz Composer Award (2011, 2012, 2014)
 Jerome Fund Commission (2014)

Discography

EPs 
 2014: Sungazer, Vol.1
 2019: Sungazer, Vol. 2

Albums 
 2021: Beautiful and Tragic
 2021: How I Loved My Cat
 2021: Perihelion

Singles 
 2017: Want to Want Me

Remixes 

 2017: Want to Want Me (Jason Derulo "djazz" remix)

Filmography

Animation 

 2018: DRUNK (visuals by Ben Levin)
 2019: ELECTRO (visuals by Ben Levin)

Live recording 

 2018: DRUNK 
 2018: Dream of Mahjong

Music video 

 2014: Dream of Mahjong (ft. Ivan Jackson)
 2014: Sequence Start
 2014: I Walk Alone (ft. Justina Soto)
 2014: Level One
 2014: Ether (ft. Pier Luigi Salami)
 2015: Ostinato
 2015: Why We Fight
 2018: Bird on the Wing
 2021: ''Saria's Song (ft. The 8-Bit Big Band)

References

External links 
YouTube Channel
Sungazer Band

Music YouTubers
American YouTubers
Living people
American jazz composers
21st-century jazz composers
American male jazz composers
American jazz bass guitarists
Berklee College of Music alumni
1988 births
21st-century American male musicians